Dirina pacifica is a species of saxicolous (rock-dwelling), crustose lichen in the family Roccellaceae. It is found in both Hawaii and the Galápagos Islands, where it grows in coastal outcrops. The lichen was formally described as a new species in 2013 by Anders Tehler and Damien Ertz. The type specimen was collected from Koolaupoko (Oahu, Hawaii). The species epithet refers to the Pacific Ocean. It has a creamy white to greyish or brownish thallus (0.1–0.3 mm thick) lacking , and a chalk-like medulla. Its ascomata have a circular outline up to 1.5 mm in diameter, with a whitish-grey . Its ascospores measure 19–27 by 4–5 μm. Dirina pacifica contains the lichen products erythrin, lecanoric acid, and sometimes three unidentified substances named "C", "F", and "G".

References

pacifica
Lichen species
Lichens described in 2013
Lichens of the Galápagos Islands
Lichens of Hawaii